Jonathan Munro is Senior Controller, News content and Deputy Director of News of BBC News.

Munro joined ITN as an editorial trainee and worked as a correspondent in the UK, Europe (for three years) and elsewhere. He covered the Yugoslav Wars, the Gulf War, the 2008 Summer Olympics and the 2012 Summer Olympics. He worked in the United States, Russia and Africa, and was Political News Editor for two years. He worked at ITN for 26 years.

In 2013, Munro replaced Fran Unsworth as the BBC's Head of Newsgathering. In 2014, the corporation flew a helicopter over Sir Cliff Richard's house. Munro supported the decision to do so, despite a court ruling that it breached the singer's privacy.

Munro was involved in the appointment of Martin Bashir to the post of BBC religious affairs correspondent in 2016. Questions about the methods by which Bashir's interview with Princess Diana was secured for the BBC sparked controversy over the appointment. Munro had informally met Bashir over coffee on 23 June 2016.

In September 2021, after Unsworth, Director, News & Current Affairs, announced she would be standing down from her position, Munro was touted as her successor. He succeeded her in an interim basis on 27 January 2022, sitting on the BBC's Executive Committee. The director-general of the BBC, Tim Davie, said Munro would hold the role "until Deborah Turness joins us later this year". Turness had been prevented from taking on the role as her employer, ITN, had denied her early release from her notice period. Munro is Turness' deputy.

Jonathan's older brother is award-winning designer, Nick Munro.

References

Living people
BBC executives
BBC News people
ITN newsreaders and journalists
Year of birth missing (living people)
BBC Board members